Eilema costimaculata is a moth of the subfamily Arctiinae described by Per Olof Christopher Aurivillius in 1910. It is found in Tanzania.

References

Endemic fauna of Tanzania
Moths described in 1910
costimaculata
Insects of Tanzania
Moths of Africa